José González (born 15 January 1946) is a Mexican gymnast. He competed in eight events at the 1968 Summer Olympics.

References

1946 births
Living people
Mexican male artistic gymnasts
Olympic gymnasts of Mexico
Gymnasts at the 1968 Summer Olympics
Sportspeople from Tlaxcala
20th-century Mexican people